Eugene Langenraedt (born 20 June 1907, date of death unknown) was a Belgian sprinter. He competed in the men's 400 metres at the 1928 Summer Olympics.

References

1907 births
Year of death missing
Athletes (track and field) at the 1928 Summer Olympics
Belgian male sprinters
Olympic athletes of Belgium
Place of birth missing